Marijan Brkić (born 20 January 1962), also known under the nickname Brk, is a Croatian guitarist and producer, best known for his work with Croatian bands such as Parni Valjak and Prljavo Kazalište, and solo artists, including Zlatan Stipišić Gibonni. He is one of the most popular Croatian guitarists and session musicians, and is also known as a composer, songwriter, arranger, producer and sound engineer.

His first popular band was Prljavo Kazalište, with whom he played from 1979 to 1989. In 1991, he joined Parni Valjak as their lead guitarist. Since he joined them, Parni Valjak has released eight albums, both studio and live, as well as compilations. He remained with Parni Valjak until the band's farewell tour and last performance in December 2005. Following the dismissal of Parni Valjak, he joined Zlatan Stipišić Gibonni. In November 2007, he released his first solo album called Bolji Svijet (A Better World), featuring collaborations with Croatian musicians such as Gibonni, Toni Cetinski, Aki Rahimovski, Dado Topić, Berislav Blažević, etc. The album also features two instrumental compositions. In 2009 he rejoined Parni Valjak on their reunion tour and has been playing with the band since.

He also runs his own recording studio "MB" in Zagreb, where Parni Valjak has recorded some of their albums.

Discography
 1979 – Prljavo Kazalište – Prljavo Kazalište
 1980 – Prljavo Kazalište – Crno-bijeli svijet
 1981 – Prljavo Kazalište – Heroj ulice
 1983 – Prljavo Kazalište – Korak od sna
 1985 – Prljavo Kazalište – Zlatne godine
 1988 – Prljavo Kazalište – Zaustavite zemlju
 1994 – Parni Valjak – Buđenje
 1995 – Parni Valjak – Bez struje: Live in ZeKaEm
 1997 – Parni Valjak – Samo Snovi Teku Uzvodno
 2000 – Parni Valjak – Zastave
 2001 – Parni Valjak – Kao Nekada – Live at S.C.
 2002 – Parni Valjak – 25 godina (DVD)
 2002 – Tina Rupčić – Prvi put
 2004 – Parni Valjak – Pretežno Sunčano?
 2005 – Parni Valjak – Koncentrat 1977–1983
 2005 – Parni Valjak – Koncentrat 1984–2005
 2005 – Parni Valjak – Bez struje: Live in ZeKaEm (DVD)
 2007 – Marijan Brkić – Bolji Svijet
 2007 – Gibonni – Acoustic/Electric

External links
 Official website
 Marijan Brkić Discography
 Parni Valjak Discography
 The Official website of Parni Valjak
 The Official website of Parni Valjak

Living people
Croatian rock guitarists
1962 births
Croatian people of Kosovan descent
Musicians from Zagreb
Croatian pop musicians